Cesare Fracassini (or Fracassi; December 18, 1838 – December 13, 1868) was an Italian painter, mainly of large mythologic or religious topics.

He was born in Rome, and studied painting there with Tommaso Minardi before enrolling in the Accademia di San Luca, where he executed several frescoes for San Lorenzo fuori le Mura. He lived alongside the painter Cesare Mariani as a young man. He often collaborated or obtained commissions with his friend Paolo Mei, as well as a colleague of Guglielmo de Sanctis and Bernardo Celentano. He died in 1868. One of his most important pictures is The Martyrs of Gorinchem, painted for a beatification ceremony in the Vatican.

In 1857, he was awarded first prize at the Concorso Clementino. He painted a St Jerome for the church of San Sebastian on via Appia. He also painted a Daphne and Chloe for an exposition in Florence. He painted the curtains (sipario) for the Teatro Argentina in Rome with Numa takes the counsel of the Egerian Nymph (1861) for the Teatro Apollo in Rome showing Apollo and Phaeton with the Solar chariot (1862), and for the theater of Orvieto. He was commissioned to paint a number of canvases for the decoration of San Lorenzo fuori la Mura. Fracassini was admired for his speed of painting.

References

Attribution:

External links

1838 births
1868 deaths
19th-century Italian painters
Italian male painters
Painters from Rome
19th-century Italian male artists